Pietrapaola is a village and comune of the province of Cosenza in the Calabria region of southern Italy.

References

External links 
Official website
Information about the city, what to see, where to stay, how to move

Cities and towns in Calabria